Clumber Park is a country park in The Dukeries near Worksop in Nottinghamshire, England. The estate, which was the seat of the Pelham-Clintons, Dukes of Newcastle, was purchased by the National Trust in 1946. It is listed Grade I on the Register of Historic Parks and Gardens.

The main house was demolished in 1938 after damage by several fires. The nearby Grade I listed chapel in Gothic Revival style and a four-acre walled kitchen garden still survive. 

The gardens and the estate are managed by the National Trust and are open to the public all year round. In 2020/21 over 350,000 people visited Clumber Park, making it one of the National Trust's top ten most visited properties.

History

Clumber, mentioned in the Domesday Book in 1086, was a monastic property in the Middle Ages but later came into the hands of the Holles family. In 1707 permission was granted to John Holles, 1st Duke of Newcastle to enclose 3000 acres of Sherwood Forest, and re-purpose it as a deer park. Clumber House, close to the River Poulter, was a pre-existing hunting lodge, which became the core of a new residence built on the site. At the 1st Duke's death in 1711, his nephew Thomas Pelham-Holles inherited the estate, but did little with it, other than spend the money he inherited. At his death in 1768, his nephew Henry Fiennes Pelham-Clinton, inherited the title and the estate, and made Clumber Park his residence. 

From 1759, work on the house and park proceeded, under the supervision of a carpenter and builder named Fuller White (although he is likely to have been working to plans from the architect Stephen Wright). White was dismissed in 1767 and Wright took charge of the project, replacing some of the 1760s features in the 1770s. The project was still not complete when Wright died and some features in and around the park may have been designed by his successor, John Simpson, in the 1780s.

In March 1879 a serious fire destroyed much of Clumber House. At the time of the fire the house contained around 500 pictures and around a fifth were destroyed in the fire. Fortunately twenty-four of the best of the collection were on loan to Nottingham Corporation, including The Beggar Boys by Thomas Gainsborough. Serious losses included a portrait of William Herbert, 3rd Earl of Pembroke by Anthony van Dyck, portraits of an old man and old woman by Rembrandt, portrait of a lady by Titian and Virgin and Child by Albrecht Dürer.

Henry Pelham-Clinton, 7th Duke of Newcastle was a minor at the time of the fire and the trustees approved the new plans by Charles Barry in 1880. Work was still going on in 1884 when it was reported that a temporary front had been built pending the erection of two large wings and an entrance hall. The other sides of the houses were completed, including the addition of a billiard room. By 1886 the building was mostly restored although it was reported that part of the west front was yet to be added. One significant improvement was a scheme whereby the sewage which used to go into the lake was diverted to Hardwick Meadows, over a mile away from the house.

Another fire, in 1912, caused less damage, but the effects of the First World War and the Great Depression forced the abandonment of the mansion, which, like many other houses during this period, was demolished in 1938 to avoid a tax bill. Prior to demolition, the 9th Duke sold the contents of the house to repay debts.

Sale and demolition 
In 1938 Charles Boot of Henry Boot Construction, was contracted to demolish the house and he removed a vast array of statues, facades and fountains to his Derbyshire home, Thornbridge Hall, although most were purchased by private buyers at auction. The Duke's study, designed by Barry, is all that survives of the main house and is presently home to the Clumber Café. It is Grade II on the National Heritage List for England.

Most of the ducal properties and land assets were sold to the London and Fort George Land Company (LFG) in 1927 by the Duke of Newcastle to pay off debts and acquired by the National Trust in 1946.

Estate

It contains the longest double avenue of lime trees in Europe. The lake was partially rebuilt in the 1980s and again in 2004 after suffering from subsidence from coal mining. Hardwick Village lies within the park, near the eastern end of the lake.

Church of St Mary 

The Church of St Mary, a Grade I listed Gothic Revival chapel was built by the 7th Duke of Newcastle.

Gardens 
It was once heated by an underfloor system, fired by local coal, allowing exotic plants to be grown all year round. The pipework is in place beneath the ornate metal floor grates. The garden is divided by pathways and contains vegetables, herbs, fruit, flowers and an ornate rose garden. The garden grows locally derived varieties such as the 'Clayworth Prize Pink' celery and more than 101 varieties of apple from the Nottinghamshire and East Midlands region including the 'Sisson's Worksop Newton' apple. The garden has large collection of rhubarb, numbering over 135 edible varieties. The lower end of the garden is reached by an iron gate to Cedar Avenue allowing colder air and moisture to move out of the garden avoiding the creation of frost pockets which could damage tender plants or reduce the growing season.

Clumber Park Bridge 

In March 2018 the park's ornamental bridge suffered extensive damage after a car was deliberately driven into it. The car, thought to be stolen, was burnt out nearby. The National Trust said it appeared to be "an act of intentional damage". The Grade-I listed bridge over the River Poulter was believed to have been built in the 1760s.

The bridge remains permanently closed to vehicular traffic. Police divers recovered hundreds of pieces of broken stone knocked into the river as a training exercise. A floating pontoon platform to support scaffolding was built and stonemasons started to rebuild the bridge using some original fragments in October 2019. The bridge was re-opened to foot-traffic only in July 2020 after extensive restorative stonework.

Just over a week after the bridge damage, a waste-bin, a National Trust van and a barn known as The Bunk House were set alight in an arson attack. Two months later in May, six engraved brass plaques containing the names of men who had died in wars were stolen from nearby Hardwick Village War Memorial. The memorial is a Grade-II listed structure and the plaques were 100 years old.

Brewhouse discovery centre 
Starting from 2009, a grant of £797,000 from the Heritage Lottery Fund enabled renovation of the Grade II listed derelict old brewhouse, part of the old stable block, to create an exhibition and discovery centre.

Site of Special Scientific Interest

A wide variety of species-rich habitats surround the former mansion, including the lake and wetlands, grassland, heath and mature deciduous woodland. The mature trees and dead and decaying ancient trees provide good habitats for beetles. There are breeding birds of woods and heath including nightjar, woodlark, redstart, hawfinch, water rail and gadwall ducks. Ancient breeds of English Longhorn cattle and Jacob sheep have been introduced to pastures surrounding the lake as part of the process for managing the grassland habitats while safeguarding rare livestock breeds. In January 2018 the National Trust sent a "heartfelt letter" to the environment manager at fracking company Ineos, asking her to visit the park and to stop its survey there for shale gas reserves.

Access and events
Close to the main parking area is a cricket pitch with a thatched roof pavilion in the style of a cottage, clad in rustic split logs. Along the road side are large open areas to park and picnic. The park is used by walkers and has several miles of paths and cycle tracks surrounding the lake. The park has bicycles for hire. The visitor centre is in the old stable block, part of which houses a display on the history of the park, a shop and restaurant. Off the main lime tree avenue are camping facilities. Route 6 of the National Cycle Network passes through the park, linking it to Sherwood Forest and Sherwood Pines.

In 2020/21 over 350,000 people visited Clumber Park, making it one of the National Trust's top ten most visited properties.

As of 2022 a parkrun takes place in the grounds every Saturday.

See also
 Church of St. Mary the Virgin, Clumber Park
 The Dukeries, Nottinghamshire
 List of Sites of Special Scientific Interest in Nottinghamshire

Notes

References

External links

 Clumber Park information at the National Trust
 History of Clumber from Worksop Heritage Trail
 Chapter about Clumber from A History of Nottinghamshire by Cornelius Brown (1896)
 Clumber House at Lost Heritage - a memorial to the lost houses of England
 Nottinghamshire Birdwatchers Clumber Park

Bassetlaw District
British country houses destroyed in the 20th century
Buildings and structures demolished in 1938
Charles Barry Jr. buildings
Clinton family (English aristocracy)
The Dukeries
Former country houses in England
Gardens by Capability Brown
Grade II listed buildings in Nottinghamshire
Grade II listed houses
Grade I listed parks and gardens in Nottinghamshire
National Trust properties in Nottinghamshire
Parks and open spaces in Nottinghamshire
Robert Taylor buildings
Sites of Special Scientific Interest in Nottinghamshire
Worksop
1912 fires in the United Kingdom
Gardens by Humphry Repton